VI Riigikogu was the sixth legislature of the Estonian Parliament (Riigikogu). The legislature was elected after 1938 elections (held on 24–25 February 1938). It sat between 7 April 1938 and 5 July 1940, after which Estonia was occupied by the Soviet Union for the first time. Estonia's previous unicameral parliamentary system had been suspended in 1934 and formally dissolved in 1937; on 1 January 1938, the country's Third Constitution came into force, creating a bicameral National Assembly, consisting of the Chamber of Deputies (Riigivolikogu) and the National Council (Riiginõukogu). These were de facto dissolved when the Soviet Union occupied Estonia and established the Supreme Soviet of the Estonian Soviet Socialist Republic.

Parties and seats

The Chamber of Deputies (Riigivolikogu)

Officers 
The following is a list of the Riigivolikogu officers during the Riigikogu's sixth legislative session:

Chairman 
 Jüri Uluots, 21 April 1938 – 12 October 1939
 Otto Pukk, from 17 October 1939

First Assistant Chairman 
 Ado Anderkopp, from 21 April 1938

Second Assistant Chairman 
 Otto Pukk, 21 April 1938 – 17 October 1939
 Rudolf Penno, from 17 October 1939

Secretary-General 
 Eugen Madisoo

Secretary 
 Peeter Malvet

The National Council (Riiginõukogu)

Officers 
The following is a list of the Riiginõukogu officers during the Riigikogu's sixth legislative session:

Chairman 
 Mihkel Pung

Assistant Chairmen 
 Alfred Maurer
 Heinrich Lauri

Secretary-General 
 Artur Mägi

Secretary 
 Herman Soone

Members of the Riigikogu

References

Riigikogu